Imperial Sport Club Dina Moscow is a futsal club based in Moscow, playing their home games in Troitsk.

History

Russia

In its first season, Dina is becoming CIS championship winner. After that Dina won all Russian championship titles till 2001. In 2000s Dina had lack of success. The main records are 1st place in regular Russian championship (2001/02), silver medals of Russian championship (2003/04) and Russian Cup final (in 2001 and 2002).

In 2009/10 Dina showed the worst result in its history at that time – 9th place. However, next season Dina's result was even worse – 10th place (penultimate place in the table). In 2013/14 Dina occupied the third place in the regular championship. In the play-off, the club beat Sinara (Ekaterinburg), Sibiryak (Novosibirsk) and Gazprom-Yugra (Yugorsk), becoming Russian champions for the first time in 14 years. In 2017 Dina won Russian Cup - 18 years after the last victory.

International area
Dina made its debut in Futsal European Clubs Championship in 1993/94. Moscow side didn't qualify to final. Dina did it the next year and won Spanish Maspalomas Sol Europa. After that Dina got two titles of the best team in Europe: in 1996/97 (opponent in the final was Italian BNL Calcetto) and in 1998/99 (they beat Lazio in the final).

Dina organized five tournaments of the International Futsal Cup, which were held in Moscow from 1997 to 2001. The Moscow club won the first one.

In 2014/15, Dina qualified for the Final Four of UEFA Futsal Cup, held in Lisbon from 24 to 26 April.

Achievements

Domestic competitions
 Russian Champions (9): 1992/93, 1993/94, 1994/95, 1995/96, 1996/97, 1997/98, 1998/99, 1999/2000, 2013/2014
 CIS Champions (1): 1991/1992
 Russian Cup winners (8): 1992, 1993, 1995, 1996, 1997, 1998, 1999, 2017
 League Cup winners (2): 1993, 1995

International competitions
 Futsal European Clubs Championship winners (3): 1995, 1997, 1999
 Futsal European Clubs Championship runners-up (2): 1998, 2001
 Intercontinental Cup winners (1): 1997

Famous players 

  Dmitri Chugunov
  Boris Chukhlov
  Aleksandr Fukin
  Sergey Koridze
  Oleg Solodovnik
  Alexey Stepanov
  Konstantin Yeryomenko
  Marko Perić

References

 MFK Dina - Official Site 

 Official page at VK.com

Dina Moskva
Dina Moskva
Futsal clubs established in 1991
1991 establishments in Russia